Darryl Cato-Bishop (born January 26, 1990) is an American football defensive lineman who is currently a free agent. He played college football at North Carolina State University in Raleigh, North Carolina and attended the Fessenden School in West Newton MA for 9th grade before finishing his HS career at Lawrence Academy in Groton, Massachusetts. He has also been a member of the Los Angeles KISS, Boston Brawlers and the Orlando Predators and Cleveland Gladiators.

Early life
Cato-Bishop attended Lawrence Academy where he played football and basketball.

College career
Cato-Bishop played for the NC State Wolfpack from 2009 to 2013. He was the team's starter his final year and helped the Wolfpack to 27 wins. He played in 48 games during his career including 28 starts at defensive end and 1 at defensive tackle.

Statistics
Source:

Professional career

Cato-Bishop was invited to rookie mini-camp with the New York Jets, but was not offered a contract.

Los Angeles KISS
On June 26, 2014, Cato-Bishop was assigned to the Los Angeles KISS. He recorded two sacks in 4 games as a rookie. On September 24, 2014, the KISS picked up his rookie option.

Boston Brawlers
Cato-Bishop played for the Boston Brawlers of the Fall Experimental Football League.

Orlando Predators
On November 30, 2015, he was assigned to the Orlando Predators.

Cleveland Gladiators
Cato-Bishop was assigned to the Cleveland Gladiators for the 2017 season.

Albany Empire
On March 19, 2018, Cato-Bishop was assigned to the Albany Empire.

Baltimore Brigade
On April 3, 2019, Cato-Bishop was assigned to the Baltimore Brigade.

References

External links
NC State Wolfpack bio

Living people
1990 births
Players of American football from Massachusetts
American football defensive linemen
NC State Wolfpack football players
Los Angeles Kiss players
Boston Brawlers players
Columbus Lions players
Orlando Predators players
Cleveland Gladiators players
Albany Empire (AFL) players
Baltimore Brigade players